Keswick may refer to:

Places

Australia
Keswick, South Australia, a suburb of Adelaide
Keswick railway station, Adelaide
Adelaide Parklands Terminal (formerly Keswick Rail Terminal)

Canada
Keswick, Edmonton, Alberta
Keswick, Ontario
Keswick, New Brunswick, on the Saint John River near Fredericton
Keswick Ridge, New Brunswick

United Kingdom
Keswick, Cumbria
Keswick, North Norfolk, part of Bacton
Keswick, South Norfolk

United States
Keswick, California
Keswick, Iowa
Keswick, Baltimore, Maryland
Keswick, Michigan
Keswick, Pennsylvania, see Keswick Theatre
Keswick, Virginia
 Keswick (Powhatan, Virginia), listed on the National Register of Historic Places

People
Keswick family, descendants of the founders of Jardine Matheson

Other uses
Keswick Christian School, Florida
Keswick Convention, an annual gathering of evangelical Christians in Keswick, Cumbria
 Keswick (T.U.F.F. Puppy), a fictional secret agent in the animated series T.U.F.F. Puppy